Ballyloughloe is a civil parish in County Westmeath, Ireland.

Ballyloughloe is one of 4 civil parishes in the barony of Clonlonan in the Province of Leinster.

Ballyloughloe civil parish comprises 55 townlands: Aghanashanamore, Aghanvoneen, Annaghgortagh, Ardyduffy, Ballydoogan, Ballymurry, Ballynagarbry, Ballynagarbry (Mullock), Ballynagarbry (Pim), Bellanalack, Belville, Boyanaghcalry, Cappaghauneen, Cappaghbrack, Carnfyan, Carnpark, Clonrelick, Clonthread, Clonyegan, Cooleen, Coolvuck Lower, Coolvuck Upper, Correagh, Creeve, Creevebeg, Dunegan, Dunlom East, Dunlom West, Fassagh, Glebe, Glen, Killachonna (Castlemaine), Killachonna (Clibborn), Killachonna (Potts), Killeenatoor, Killinroan, Knockdomny, Labaun, Legan, Mackanranny, Magheramore, Mount Temple, Moydrum (East), Nahod Little, Nahod More, Rathduff, Shurock, Tullaghanshanlin, Tully, Tullybane, Tullywood, Twyford, Warren High, Warren Lower and Williamstown.

The neighbouring civil parishes are: Ballymore, Drumraney and Kilkenny West to the north, Kilcumreragh to the east, Kilcleagh and Kilmanaghan to the south and St. Mary's to the west.

References

External links
Ballyloughloe civil parish at the IreAtlas Townland Data Base
Ballyloughloe civil parish at townlands.ie
Ballyloughloe civil parish at The Placenames Database of Ireland

Civil parishes of County Westmeath